Cava (minor planet designation: 505 Cava) is a minor planet orbiting the Sun.

In 2001, the asteroid was detected by radar from the Arecibo Observatory at a distance of 1.18 AU.

References

External links
 
 

Background asteroids
Cava
Cava
FC-type asteroids (Tholen)
19020821